James C. Eisenach is an American anesthesiologist, currently the FM James, III Professor at Wake Forest School of Medicine, Wake Forest University and the former Editor-in-Chief of American Society of Anesthesiologists's journal Anesthesiology.

References

Year of birth missing (living people)
Living people
Wake Forest University faculty
American anesthesiologists
University of Nebraska alumni
California Institute of Technology alumni
University of California, San Francisco alumni
Medical journal editors